Morris Bayour Power (born 13 March 1984) is a Liberian professional football player. Born in Monrovia, Liberia, who played for PSGC Galuh Ciamis in the Liga Indonesia Premier Division

References

1985 births
Living people
Sportspeople from Monrovia
Liberian expatriate footballers
Liberian expatriate sportspeople in Indonesia
Indonesian Premier Division players
Persibat Batang players
Persibo Bojonegoro players
Pro Duta FC players
Persipasi Bekasi players
PSIS Semarang players
Liberian footballers
Association football defenders